Newport Cliffs is a Site of Special Scientific Interest (or SSSI) lying a little to the north of Newport in Pembrokeshire, South Wales. It has been designated as a Site of Special Scientific Interest since January 1954 in an attempt to protect its fragile biological elements.

Type and features
This site is designated due to its biological qualities. SSSIs in Wales have been notified for a total of 142 different animal species and 191 different plant species.

This site has four special features.
  Sea cliffs and associated ledges and crevices
  Coastal grassland
  Coastal heathland
  Perennial centaury
The site has other habitats and species that contribute to the wildlife interest including cliff-nesting chough, peregrine falcons, and razorbill. Rare plants include: royal fern, sea spleenwort and sea purslane.

See also
List of Sites of Special Scientific Interest in Pembrokeshire

References

External links
Natural Resources Wales website

Sites of Special Scientific Interest in Pembrokeshire
Cliffs of Pembrokeshire